Pono Moatlhodi is a seasoned veteran politician from Botswana. He is the BDP Member of Parliament for Tonota South and Deputy Speaker of the National Assembly.He had a brief stint as an MP for the opposition Umbrella for Democratic Change (UDC), before he u-turned back to his former home, the BDP.

References 

Living people
Year of birth missing (living people)
Place of birth missing (living people)
Botswana Democratic Party politicians
21st-century Botswana politicians
Deputy Speakers of the National Assembly (Botswana)
Members of the National Assembly (Botswana)